The Mine Workers' Union of Canada was a trade union in the mining sector in Canada. MWUC was affiliated to the Workers' Unity League, and lasted for approximately a decade.

Founding
MWUC was founded in 1925, as Alberta rank and file unionists broke away from the United Mine Workers of America District 18. Several of the founders of the union were cadres of the Communist Party of Canada. By September 1926 MWUC was the largest miners' union in Alberta, with around 4,000 members in fifteen camps.

MWUC was one of the founders of the All-Canadian Congress of Labour in 1927.

Leadership
James Sloan was the president of MWUC. L. Maurice was the vice president of the union. John Stokaluk was the national secretary of MWUC.

1931 Bienfait-Estevan struggle

In the summer of 1931 MWUC was contacted by miners from Bienfait and Estevan in Saskatchewan. The Bienfait-Estevan miners lived in miserable conditions, but the Trades and Labour Congress of Canada had paid little attention to them. MWUC sent its organizers to Bienfait-Estevan. MWUC was able to mobilize a large majority of local miners, preparing for a strike. The mine owners rejected negotiations, and the mayor of Estevan prohibited manifestations by MWUC. When the MWUC took to the streets to protest, they were met with police fire. Three people were killed on September 29, 1931. Twelve miners were arrested in the aftermath. Following these events, MWUC lost its foothold in the area.

Registration
MWUC was registered with the Canadian authorities on March 19, 1926. The registration was cancelled by the Department of Secretary of State on August 22, 1935.

References

Defunct trade unions in Canada
1925 establishments in Alberta
1935 disestablishments in Canada
Mining trade unions
Trade unions established in 1925